A Decade is Canadian alternative rock band Our Lady Peace's first compilation album, released on November 21, 2006, in Canada, and November 28, 2006, in the United States. In addition to songs from the band's first six albums, the set included two unreleased songs, "Kiss on the Mouth" and "Better Than Here".

The Canadian release of the album includes a bonus DVD containing a feature-length concert/documentary directed by Rafael Ouellet and produced by Robi Levy.  The film features interviews with the current band members, behind the scenes footage, and performances of the songs "Picture", "Thief", "Innocent", "Where Are You", "Wipe That Smile Off Your Face", and "Clumsy" shot on November 6, 2005, at Massey Hall in Toronto. It also includes a photo gallery, and discography with lyrics.

"4am" and "One Man Army" have been remixed from their original album versions.

"In Repair" and "Life" appear with narration from Ray Kurzweil's book The Age of Spiritual Machines, which inspired the album on which the two songs first appeared, Spiritual Machines. The narration on the version of "Life" issued here was not included on the original version from Spiritual Machines.

The first single from the album was "Kiss on the Mouth", released in Canada in September 2006.

Track listing

See also
Our Lady Peace discography
The Very Best of Our Lady Peace (their second compilation album)

References

2006 greatest hits albums
Our Lady Peace albums